Muhammad ibn Ibrāhīm ibn al-Akfani (1286-ca. 1348–49) was a Kurdish  Cairene encyclopedist and physician.

Life
Ibn al-Akfani was born in Sinjar, Iraq and lived in Cairo, Egypt. He worked at Al-Mansuri Hospital. He died in either 1348 or 1349 of the bubonic plague.

Work
He wrote at least 22 books. Most of his books were science related, including logic, gemology, mathematics, medicine and astronomy. Specific subjects include bloodletting, slavery and ophthalmology.

His most famous work was a science encyclopedia called Iršād al-qāsid ilā asnā' al-maqāsid. The encyclopedia examines 60 subjects with bibliographies and a glossary of terms. His book, Kitāb nuhab al-dahā'ir fī ahwāl al-jawāhir, is about gemstones, with a focus about jacinth.

References

1286 births
14th-century physicians
14th-century deaths from plague (disease)
Medieval Egyptian physicians
Encyclopedists of the medieval Islamic world
Physicians from Cairo
People from Sinjar
14th-century Arabic writers
14th-century Kurdish people